Carbon diselenide is an inorganic compound with the chemical formula CSe2. It is a yellow-orange oily liquid with pungent odor. It is the selenium analogue of carbon disulfide (CS2) and carbon dioxide (CO2). This light-sensitive compound is insoluble in water and soluble in organic solvents.

Synthesis, structure and reactions
Carbon diselenide is a linear molecule with D∞h symmetry. It is produced by reacting selenium powder with dichloromethane vapor near 550 °C.
2 Se + CH2Cl2 → CSe2 + 2 HCl
It was first reported by Grimm and Metzger, who prepared it by treating hydrogen selenide with carbon tetrachloride in a hot tube.

Like carbon disulfide, carbon diselenide polymerizes under high pressure. The structure of the polymer is thought to be a head-to-head structure with a backbone in the form of –[Se–C(=Se)–C(=Se)–Se]–.
The polymer is a semiconductor with a room-temperature conductivity of 50 S/cm.

In addition, carbon diselenide is a precursor to tetraselenafulvalenes, the selenium analogue of tetrathiafulvalene, which can be further used to synthesize organic conductors and organic superconductors.

Carbon diselenide reacts with secondary amines to give dialkydiselenocarbamates:
2 Et2NH + CSe2 → (Et2NH2+)(Et2NCSe2−)

Safety
Carbon diselenide has high vapor pressure. It has a moderate toxicity and presents an inhalation hazard. It may be dangerous due to its easy membrane transport. It decomposes slowly in storage (about 1% per month at –30 °C). When obtained commercially, its cost is high.

Pure distilled carbon diselenide has an odor very similar to that of carbon disulfide, but mixed with air, it creates extremely offensive odors (corresponding to new, highly toxic reaction products). Its smell forced an evacuation of a nearby village when it was first synthesized in 1936. Because of the odor, synthetic pathways have been developed to avoid its use.

References

Selenides
Inorganic carbon compounds
Foul-smelling chemicals
Dichalcogenides
IV-VI semiconductors